Gisela Grothaus (married Steigerwald; born 20 February 1955) is a West German retired slalom canoeist who competed in the early and mid-1970s. She won a silver medal in the K-1 event at the 1972 Summer Olympics in Munich.

She won also three world championships in wildwater canoeing at senior level at the Wildwater Canoeing World Championships.

The question about surname
Gisela Grothaus was married during the fall of 1984 and her new name became Steigerwald, therefore she should have assumed her new name "Gisela Steigerwald" in international competitions since 1984, however in the databases of the International Canoe Federation and the European Canoe Association, she is indicated by the name "Gisela Steigerwald" even before this year.

References

External links
 

1955 births
Canoeists from Berlin
Canoeists at the 1972 Summer Olympics
Living people
Olympic canoeists of West Germany
Olympic silver medalists for West Germany
West German female canoeists
Olympic medalists in canoeing
Medalists at the 1972 Summer Olympics